Hesaruiyeh (also Romanized as Ḩeşārū’īyeh; also known as Hazār, Hazārū, and Hisāru) is a village in Khatunabad Rural District, in the Central District of Shahr-e Babak County, Kerman Province, Iran. At the 2006 census, its population was 221, in 54 families.

Etymology
One local author suggests that the name comes from the words Ḩeşār, meaning "fort", "fence", "wall", or "barrier", and bārū meaning "fortification".

History
Ḩeşārū’īyeh served as the stronghold of the Ismailis and is home to many Ismailies who have contributed a lot to building Shahr-e-Babak when they ruled Shahr-e Babak 150 to 200 years ago in the 1800s.

Surroundings
Ḩeşārū’īyeh is located close to Road 71, a national highway that connects Tehran in the north to Bandar-Abbas in the South. Beside the forts and the barriers, there is also a horseshoe-like stretched hill nearby called Tale-h Hesar, meaning "hill of the fort".

References

External links

 Photos from Hesarooyeh

Populated places in Shahr-e Babak County